Michael Brenner may refer to:
 Michael Brenner (historian) (born 1964), German-Jewish historian
 Michael P. Brenner, American applied mathematician
 Mike Brenner, American musician